Hlaliyeh (Saida) is a  suburb of Sidon in Lebanon.

History
In 1838, Eli Smith noted  el-Helaliyeh,  as a village located in "Aklim et-Tuffah, adjacent to Seida".

In 1875 Victor Guérin traveled in the region, and noted about Helalieh: "This village has 200 inhabitants, either Maronites or United Greeks. The church was built, as well as several houses, with regular stones of ancient appearance."

References

Bibliography

External links
Hlaliyeh (Saida), Localiban 

Populated places in Sidon District
Maronite Christian communities in Lebanon